Christoph Maria Herbst (born 9 February 1966) is a German actor and comedian.

Early life 
Herbst was born in Wuppertal. After passing the Abitur, he became a trainee banker and was active at the free theatre scene in Wuppertal at the same time.

Career

Theatre 
In 1986, Herbst was a founding member of the private Theater in Cronenberg and its acting school. He's still performing in German theatres. Most recently, he performed "Männerhort" (Men nursery) at the Theater am Kurfürstendamm in Berlin together with Bastian Pastewka, Michael Kessler and Jürgen Tonkel. He is married to Gisi Herbst.

Television 
Herbst made his first appearance in German television in the show Sketchup – The Next Generation in 1997. From 2002 to 2004, he performed as a supporting actor in Ladykracher. In 2004, he had his first leading role in the ProSieben series Stromberg. In October 2006, the work on the third season of Stromberg began, airing in early 2007. Herbst also appeared in Sesamstraße in 2006, and in Anke Engelke's show Ladyland. In 2007, his seven-piece series Hilfe! Hochzeit! – Die schlimmste Woche meines Lebens, an adaptation of the British series The Worst Week of My Life, was broadcast.

Film 
Herbst's movie career began in 1998 in the film Der wirklich letzte Junggeselle ("The last bachelor"). His star roles were together with Michael "Bully" Herbig, Rick Kavanian and Christian Tramitz in Traumschiff Surprise – Periode 1 in 2003, as well as his appearance as the butler Alfons Hatler in the 2004 movie Der Wixxer together with Oliver Kalkofe, Thomas Fritsch, Oliver Welke and other leading German comedians. In 2006, Herbst teamed up again with Herbig in the movie Hui-Buh, das Schlossgespenst, starring as King Julius, the 111th. His more prominent role was in the movie Look Who's Back as Christoph Sensenbrink.

Filmography 

 1998: Der wirklich letzte Junggeselle
 2003: Traumschiff Surprise – Periode 1
 2004: Stromberg Season 1 (TV series)
 2004: Der WiXXer
 2004: 
 2004: 
 2005: Stromberg Season 2 (TV series)
 2005: 
 2006: Hui Buh – Das Schlossgespenst
 2006: Pastewka (TV series)
 2006: Wo ist Fred!?
 2006: Impy's Island (voice)
 2007: Stromberg Season 3 (TV series)
 2007: 
 2007: Neues vom WiXXer
 2007: Hilfe! Hochzeit! – Die schlimmste Woche meines Lebens (TV series)
 2007: 
 2007: Tramitz & Friends (TV series)
 2007: Jakobs Bruder
 2008: Mord mit Aussicht (TV series)
 2008: Don Quixote (TV movie)
 2008: Urmel voll in Fahrt (voice)
 2008: 
 2009: Stromberg Season 4 (TV series)
 2009: Vicky the Viking
 2010: Kreutzer kommt
 2011: Vicky and the Treasure of the Gods
 2013: 
 2014: Stromberg – Der Film
 2014: 
 2015: 3 Türken und ein Baby
 2015: 
 2015: 
 2015: 
 2015: Look Who's Back
 2018: 
 2021: Contra
 2022:

Awards 
 2002: Deutscher Comedypreis as Best Supporting Actor in Ladykracher
 2005: Bayerischer Fernsehpreis for Stromberg
 2005: Deutscher Comedypreis as Best Actor for Stromberg
 2005: Goldener Gong for Stromberg
 2005: Jupiter-Filmpreis as Best TV Actor
 2006: Adolf-Grimme-Preis for Stromberg
 2006: Deutscher Comedypreis as Best Actor in a Comedy series for Stromberg
 2006: GQ – Man of the year in the category TV
 2006: Sony Music – Triple-Platinum for over 150,000 sold Stromberg DVDs
 2007: Deutscher Comedypreis as Best Actor (in a Comedy series) for Stromberg

References

External links 

 
Interview with Christoph Maria Herbst (in German)

1966 births
Living people
German male film actors
Actors from Wuppertal
German male comedians
German television personalities
German male television actors
21st-century German male actors